Adelaide Community Healthcare Alliance is a South Australian private hospital group incorporated on 9 November 1999. Healthscope has had day-to-day operational responsibility for the hospitals since 2003.

It comprises the following hospitals:
Ashford Hospital, opened in 1950 as a joint collaboration between Unley, Mitcham, West Torrens and Marion Councils, with a group of western suburbs doctors.
Flinders Private Hospital opened in 1999 adjacent to Flinders Medical Centre and the Flinders University School of Medicine.
The Memorial Hospital, North Adelaide opened in March 1919 with the first patient being admitted in 1920 by the South Australian Methodist Conference to honour veterans of World War I.

References

External links

Hospital networks in Australia
Hospitals in Adelaide
Organizations established in 1999
1999 establishments in Australia